The PT Mi-K is a Czechoslovakian metal-cased anti-tank blast landmine. The mine uses a metal grid instead a pressure plate, this gives it resistance to overpressure. The mine is no longer produced, but is found in Afghanistan, Cambodia, Eritrea, Namibia, Nicaragua and the Western Sahara.

Description
The mine has a circular metal case inside which is the doughnut shaped main charge, in the centre of which the fuse is inserted. On top of the mine is a metal pressure grid. The grid is held in place by a thin metal wall. Sufficient pressure on the grid causes the wall to collapse sideways, allowing the grid to press down on a plunger triggering a 3.5 oz (0.1 kg) Toul (Tetryl)  booster charge, detonating the mine.

The mine can be fitted with two main fuzes, the RO-5 and the RO-9 fuse. The RO-5 fuse may be fitted with an RO-3 anti-lifting device, which will trigger the mine if it is raised.

Specifications
 Weight: 7.2 kg
 Explosive content: 5 kg of TNT
 Diameter: 300 mm
 Height: 102 mm
 Activation pressure: 330 kg

References
 Jane's Mines and Mine Clearance 2005-2006

Anti-tank mines
Land mines of Czechoslovakia